The Address Party was one of the two political groups of the National Assembly of 1861 in Hungary. The group was led by Ferenc Deák. In 1865 the party was renamed to Deák Party. The Deák Party was succeeded by the Liberal Party which led Hungary until 1905.

References
 Závodszky, Géza: Történelem III. Budapest, 2002.

Defunct political parties in Hungary
1861 establishments in the Austrian Empire
Political parties established in 1861
Political parties disestablished in 1865
1865 disestablishments